Holaspis laevis, commonly known as the eastern serrate-toed tree lizard or eastern neon blue-tailed tree lizard is a species of lizard occurring in Sierra Leone, Ghana, Nigeria, Cameroon, Equatorial Guinea, Democratic Republic of the Congo, Uganda, Tanzania, Malawi, and Mozambique. H. laevis was formerly only a subspecies of H. guentheri.

Etymology
The Latin word "laevis " means smooth.

Vivarium keeping
Nearly all Holaspis in the pet trade are H. laevis. Captive breeding resulted in an increase of information on the biology of Holaspis.

In the "Cologne Aquarium" a female of H. laevis from Tanzania laid one to two eggs on 14 November, 22 December, 24 February and 5 April. Only one egg hatched after 54 days of incubation. Incubation of eggs was more successfully by Kroniger & Bosch (2001). Females of H. laevis deposited eggs under the bark. Clutch almost always consisted of two eggs, rarely only one egg was laid by younger females. They produced clutches every four to six weeks during the year. Egg size at oviposition was (6.0 - 7.2) mm x (11.3 - 12.9) mm and their mass (0.30 - 0.38) g. At 29 °C (84 °F) the incubation time was 55 to 57 days. Sexual maturity is reached in 1.5 to 2 years in captivity.

References

Holaspis
Reptiles described in 1896
Taxa named by Franz Werner